Karimnagar mandal is one of the mandal in Karimnagar district of the Indian state of Telangana. It is under the administration of Karimnagar revenue division and the headquarters are located at Karimnagar.

Government and politics 

Karimnagar mandal is the only mandal under Karimnagar assembly constituency, which in turn represents Karimnagar lok sabha constituency of Telangana Legislative Assembly.

Towns and villages 

 census, the mandal has 30 settlements. It includes 2 towns and 28 villages.

The settlements in the mandal are listed below:

 Arepalle (OG)
 Asifnagar
 Baddipalle
 Bommakal (OG)
 Chamanpalle
 Chegurti
 Cherlabuthkur
 Chintakunta (OG) (Part)
 Chintakunta (Part)
 Durshed
 Elbotharam
 Elgandal
 Fakeerpet
 Hasnapur
 Irukulla
 Jublinagar
Kamanpur
Karimnagar (M)
 Khazipur
 Kothapalle(Haveli)
 Lakshmipur
 Malkapur
 Maqdumpur
 Nagunur
 Pothgal
 Rekurthi (CT)
 Sitarampur (OG)
 Taharakondapur
 Wallampahad
 Arepalle (Part)

Note: M-Municipality, CT–Census town, OG–Out growth

See also 
 List of mandals in Telangana

References 

Mandals in Karimnagar district